Devin Moore (born Devin Darnell Thompson on May 15, 1985 in Fayette, Alabama) is a convicted murderer from Alabama who sparked a controversy over the video game Grand Theft Auto: Vice City when he committed three acts of first-degree murder in the Fayette, Alabama police station in 2003. Moore killed two policemen (Arnold Strickland and James Crump) and a dispatcher (Leslie Mealer) after being booked on suspicion of stealing a car. He then fled in a highway patrol vehicle.

Moore was apprehended later in Mississippi. According to the Associated Press, after his recapture he said, "Life is a video game. Everybody's got to die sometime." Once in custody, Moore quickly confessed. He told detectives that he shot the men because he didn't want to go to jail.

The controversy involving his relation to Grand Theft Auto was revealed during an episode of 60 Minutes on March 4, 2005. In the episode, a student demonstrated Grand Theft Auto to them, showing them the adult nature of the game. Moore, who recently graduated from high school at the time, had no criminal record and was never in trouble before. He had enlisted in the Air Force and was due to leave for service at the end of the summer.

Legal proceedings

Moore faced trial in 2005 and pleaded not guilty. The trial judge barred the defense from introducing evidence to the jury that Grand Theft Auto incited Moore's shooting spree. Moore's attorney, Jim Standridge, contended that Moore was suffering from post-traumatic stress disorder at the time of the crimes. Standridge argued that, as a child, Moore had been emotionally and physically abused by his father.

In August 2005, Moore was convicted as charged. On October 9, 2005, he was sentenced to death by lethal injection. Jim Standridge appealed the case. On February 17, 2012, the Alabama Court of Criminal Appeals upheld Moore's conviction in a 5–0 decision. The case will automatically be appealed to the Alabama Supreme Court, and can then be appealed to the Supreme Court of the United States.

Personal life 
Moore is the brother of Mookie Moore, a former National Football League player.

See also
 List of death row inmates in the United States
 Strickland v. Sony
 The Gamechangers

References

1985 births
Living people
American people convicted of murdering police officers
American prisoners sentenced to death
People with post-traumatic stress disorder
People convicted of murder by Alabama
People from Fayette, Alabama
Prisoners sentenced to death by Alabama